Mura Para Union is a union, the smallest administrative body of Bangladesh, located in Rupganj Upazila, Narayanganj District, Bangladesh. The total population is 27,009.

References

Unions of Rupganj Upazila